Burger King Dinner Baskets were a series of products introduced in 1993 by the international fast-food restaurant chain Burger King. The products were designed to add appeal to families and customers looking for a "higher class" meal found in family style restaurants.

Product description 

Varieties included:
 Whopper Dinner Basket
 Steak Sandwich Dinner Basket
 Chicken Dinner Basket
 Shrimp Dinner Basket
 Flame-broiled Meatloaf Sandwich
 Fried clams, regional fare for the New England market

Side orders
 Choice of Fries or Baked Potato
 Choice of Cole Slaw or Side Salad

Also, complimentary popcorn was given to customers to eat while waiting for their meal to be brought to their table.

Advertising 
The campaign was created by New York based agency D'Arcy Masius Benton & Bowles. The original ads were used to promote the Burger King Every Day Value Menu and Burger King Dinner Baskets. The advertising program was designed as part of a back to basics plan by Burger King after a series of disappointing advertising schemes including the failure of its 1980s Where's Herb? campaign. One of the main parts of the plan was to introduce a value menu in response to McDonald's, Taco Bell and Wendy's.

Many of the ads featured Dan Cortese as Dan the Whopper Man, while others included featured clips from rap music artists Kid 'n Play's film House Party. The cross-promotion of the Disney film Aladdin was also advertised under this promotion, as well as Last Action Hero. The last commercials using this campaign was when it promoted The Nightmare Before Christmas.

See also 
 Whopper
 Burger King Specialty Sandwiches

References 

Burger King foods
Products introduced in 1993